Luke Brown (born 22 September 1992) is a former professional Australian rules football player who played for the Adelaide Football Club in the Australian Football League (AFL). He was first recruited by incoming club  as a pre-selection and was then traded to Adelaide during the 2011 trade week.

AFL career
He ultimately made his debut in round 16, against  at Skoda Stadium, and went on to play three games for Adelaide that season as well as playing in the SANFL Grand Final for Norwood.

Brown established himself in Adelaide's team as a negating small defender in 2013, filling the role vacated by retired veteran Michael Doughty and playing 21 of a possible 22 games. He signed a two-year deal with the club early in the year, and was nominated for the 2013 AFL Rising Star award in the final round of the season. Brown continued to play this role to great effect in 2014 and 2015, playing every game in both seasons, keeping the opposition's best small forward to a goal a game or less, and developing his attacking game with a disposal efficiency of 80.2% in 2015. During the year, Brown signed another two-year contract with Adelaide.During the finals series of the 2022 season, Brown announced his retirement after 189 AFL matches,which included being part of the 2017 losing team in the Grand Final.

Statistics
 Statistics are correct to end of round 8, 2016.

|- style="background:#eaeaea;"
! scope="row" style="text-align:center" | 2012
| style="text-align:center" | 
| 16 || 3 || 0 || 0 || 12 || 7 || 19 || 9 || 2 || 0.0 || 0.0 || 4.0 || 2.3 || 6.3 || 3.0 || 0.7
|-
! scope="row" style="text-align:center" | 2013
| style="text-align:center" | 
| 16 || 21 || 1 || 0 || 176 || 118 || 294 || 88 || 37 || 0.1 || 0.0 || 8.4 || 5.6 || 14.0 || 4.2 || 1.8
|- style="background:#eaeaea;"
! scope="row" style="text-align:center" | 2014
| style="text-align:center" | 
| 16 || 22 || 1 || 1 || 138 || 148 || 286 || 55 || 54 || 0.1 || 0.1 || 6.3 || 6.7 || 13.0 || 2.5 || 2.5
|-
! scope="row" style="text-align:center" | 2015
| style="text-align:center" | 
| 16 || 23 || 1 || 1 || 185 || 102 || 287 || 75 || 41 || 0.0 || 0.0 || 8.0 || 4.4 || 12.5 || 3.3 || 1.8
|- style="background:#eaeaea;"
! scope="row" style="text-align:center" | 2016
| style="text-align:center" | 
| 16 || 8 || 1 || 1 || 90 || 52 || 142 || 33 || 27 || 0.1 || 0.1 || 11.3 || 6.5 || 17.8 || 4.1 || 3.4
|- class="sortbottom"
! colspan=3| Career
! 77
! 4
! 3
! 601
! 427
! 1028
! 260
! 161
! 0.1
! 0.0
! 7.8
! 5.6
! 13.4
! 3.4
! 2.1
|}

References

External links

1992 births
Living people
Adelaide Football Club players
Norwood Football Club players
Australian rules footballers from South Australia